Claude Lagarde (21 June 1895 – 20 July 1983) was a French sports shooter. He competed in the trap event at the 1952 Summer Olympics.

References

1895 births
1983 deaths
French male sport shooters
Olympic shooters of France
Shooters at the 1952 Summer Olympics
Place of birth missing